Henry Fry (January 29, 1826 – April 16, 1892) was an English-born merchant, miner and political figure in British Columbia. He represented Cowichan in the Legislative Assembly of British Columbia from 1887 to 1890.

He was born in Barnstaple, Devon and was educated there. Fry entered his father's business and later pursued business in other parts of England. In 1855, he moved to Hamilton, Ontario, establishing himself in business there. Fry sold his business in Hamilton in 1860 and returned to England. In 1862, he came to Victoria and then went to Cariboo where he was involved in mining. From 1864 to 1869, he operated a business in Victoria. He then purchased a farm in the Cowichan Valley. Fry was elected to the assembly in an 1887 by-election held following the death of William Smithe. He died in the Victoria District at the age of 66.

References 

1826 births
1892 deaths
Independent MLAs in British Columbia